Harry Shields (June 30, 1899 – January 19, 1971) was an early jazz clarinetist.

Harry Shields was born in Uptown New Orleans, Louisiana, the younger brother of noted clarinetist Larry Shields.  Harry spent almost his whole career in New Orleans.  He played with the bands of Norman Brownlee, Sharkey Bonano, Tom Brown, Johnny Wiggs, and others.  Many fellow musicians regarded Harry as superior to his more famous brother, Larry.  Johnny Wiggs commented that Harry Shields was the only clarinetist he'd heard who could always play the right note without fail.

Notes

References

 Song of Harry Shields on Apple Music

1899 births
1971 deaths
Dixieland clarinetists
Jazz musicians from New Orleans
American jazz clarinetists
20th-century American musicians